Soesokkak is a famous natural landscape on Jejudo. It is located at the mouth of the Hyodoncheon. The name comes from the Jeju dialect: soe means "a village of Hyodon", so means "pond", and -kkak is a suffix meaning "end". Soesokkak was listed as a state-designated cultural property by the Cultural Heritage Administration on June 30, 2011.

It is located between routes 5 and 6 of the Jeju Olle Trail, and is a popular destination for visitors due to its views of the coast and activities such as kayaking and traditional raft rides. Since 2003, the Soesokkak Beach Festival has been held near Soesokkak.

References 

Landforms of Jeju Province